The Detroit News is one of the two major newspapers in the U.S. city of Detroit, Michigan.  The paper began in 1873, when it rented space in the rival Detroit Free Press building.  The News absorbed the Detroit Tribune on February 1, 1919, the Detroit Journal on July 21, 1922, and on November 7, 1960, it bought and closed the faltering Detroit Times. However, it retained the Times''' building, which it used as a printing plant until 1975, when a new facility opened in Sterling Heights. The Times building was demolished in 1978.  The street in downtown Detroit where the Times building once stood is still called "Times Square."  The Evening News Association, owner of The News, merged with Gannett in 1985.

At the time of its acquisition of The News, Gannett also had other Detroit interests, as its outdoor advertising company, which ultimately became Outfront Media through a series of mergers, operated many billboards across Detroit and the surrounding area, including advertising displays on Detroit Department of Transportation and Southeastern Michigan Transportation Authority buses, with its only competitor, primarily along Metro Detroit's freeway network, being 3M National Advertising (now Lamar Advertising).The News claims to have been the first newspaper in the world to operate a radio station, station 8MK, which began broadcasting August 20, 1920.  8MK is now CBS-owned WWJ.  In 1947, it established Michigan's first television station, WWJ-TV, now WDIV-TV; it has been a primary NBC affiliate since sign-on, owing to WWJ-AM's ties with the NBC Radio Network.

In 1989, the paper entered into a one hundred year joint operating agreement with the rival Free Press, combining business operations while keeping separate editorial staffs.  The combined company is called the Detroit Media Partnership (DMP). The Free Press moved into The News building in 1998 and until May 7, 2006, the two published a single joint weekend edition. Today, The News is published Monday–Saturday, and has an editorial page in the Sunday Free Press.The Detroit News has an online version, including a separate website for connections from European Union countries that does not track personal information.The Detroit News has won three Pulitzer Prizes.

HistoryThe Detroit News was founded by James E. Scripps, who, in turn, was the older half-brother and one-time partner of Edward W. Scripps. The paper's eventual success, however, is largely credited to Scripps' son-in-law, George Gough Booth, who came aboard at the request of his wife's father. Booth went on to construct Michigan's largest newspaper empire, founding the independent Booth Newspapers chain (now owned by S.I. Newhouse's Advance Publications) with his two brothers.The Detroit News building was erected in 1917. It was designed by architect Albert Kahn, who included a faux-stone concrete building with large street-level arches to admit light. The arches along the east and south side of the building were bricked-in for protection after the 12th Street Riot in 1967. The bricked-in arches on the east and south ends of the building were reopened during renovations required when the Free Press relocated its offices there 20 years later.

In 1931, The Detroit News made history when it bought a three-place Pitcairn PCA-2 auto-gyro as a camera aircraft that could take off and land in restricted places and semi-hover for photos.  It was the ancestor of today's well-known news helicopter. In 1935 a single Lockheed Model 9 Orion was purchased and modified by Lockheed as a news camera plane for The Detroit News. To work in that role, a pod was built into the frontal leading edge of the right-wing about  out from the fuselage. This pod had a glass dome on the front and a mounted camera. To aim the camera the pilot was provided with a primitive grid-like gun sight on his windshield.

Deb Price’s debut column in The Detroit News in 1992 was the first syndicated national column in American mainstream media that spoke about gay life.

On July 13, 1995, Newspaper Guild employees of the Detroit Free Press and The News along with pressmen, printers and Teamsters, working for the "Detroit Newspapers" distribution arm, went on strike. Approximately half of the staffers crossed the picket line before the unions ended their strike in February 1997.  The strike was resolved in court three years later, with the journalists' union losing its unfair labor practices case on appeal.  Still, the weakened unions remain active at the paper, representing a majority of the employees under their jurisdiction.

August 3, 2005, Gannett announced that it would sell The News to MediaNews Group and purchase the Free Press from the Knight Ridder company.  With this move, Gannett became the managing partner in the papers' joint operating agreement. On May 7, 2006, the combined Sunday Detroit News and Free Press was replaced by a stand-alone Sunday Free Press. On December 16, 2008, Detroit Media Partnership announced a plan to limit weekday home delivery for both dailies to Thursday and Friday only. On other weekdays the paper sold at newsstands would be smaller, about 32 pages, and redesigned. This arrangement went into effect on March 30, 2009.

In February 2014, the DMP announced its offices along with those of The News and the Free Press would move from the West Lafayette building to six floors in both the old and new sections of the former Federal Reserve building at 160 West Fort Street.  The partnership expected to place signs on the exterior similar to those on the former offices.  The move took place October 24–27, 2014.

Editorially, The News is considered more conservative than the Free Press.  However, it considers itself libertarian.  In an editorial statement printed in 1958, The News described itself as consistently conservative on economic issues and consistently liberal on civil liberties issues.  It has never endorsed a Democrat for president, and has only failed to endorse a Republican presidential candidate five times: twice during the Franklin D. Roosevelt era; in 2004, when it did not endorse George W. Bush for re-election; in 2016, when it endorsed Libertarian Party nominee Gary Johnson rather than Republican nominee Donald Trump, and in 2020, when it continued to withhold its endorsement from Trump and did not endorse a candidate.

Staff
The staff of The Detroit News'' includes columnists Nolan Finley, Ingrid Jacques, Bankole Thompson; design writer Maureen Feighan; food critic Melody Baetens; sports columnists Bob Wojnowski and John Niyo; sportswriters Angelique Chengelis, Tony Paul, Justin Rogers, Chris McCosky, Mike Curtis, Rod Beard, David Goricki, Matt Charboneau, Nolan Bianchi, Ted Kulfan and James Hawkins; auto critic Henry Payne and business columnist Daniel Howes.

The staff also includes metro reporter Robert Snell, who was named Michigan Journalist of the Year in 2014, 2018, and 2020 by the Detroit chapter of the Society of Professional Journalists.

Former staff
 Jack Berry, sportswriter from 1971 to 1993

Awards
2017 Sigma Delta Chi Award Christine MacDonald
1994 Pulitzer Prize for Beat Reporting Eric Freedman and Jim Mitzelfeld
1982 Pulitzer Prize for Public Service The Detroit News
1977 Penney-Missouri Award for General Excellence.
1942 Pulitzer Prize for Photography Milton Brooks (the first winner of a photojournalism Pulitzer)

See also

 Media in Detroit
 Warren T. Brookes

References

External links

 
 
 Detroit Media Partnership 
 
 
 Images from the Detroit News at Wayne State University

 
Newspapers published in Detroit
Pulitzer Prize-winning newspapers
MediaNews Group publications
Publications established in 1873
Pulitzer Prize for Public Service winners
1873 establishments in Michigan